Bobs Lake or Bob's Lake may refer to one of these lakes in Ontario, Canada:

Bobs Lake (Peterson Creek), in North Frontenac, Frontenac County
Bobs Lake (Renfrew County), in Brudenell, Lyndoch and Raglan, Renfrew County
Bobs Lake (Shallow River), in Cochrane District
Bobs Lake (Sudbury District), in Sudbury District
Bobs Lake (Tay River), in Frontenac County and Lanark County
Bob's Lake (Hastings County), in Wollaston, Hastings County
Bob's Lake (Parry Sound District, Ontario), in geographic Patterson Township in Parry Sound District
Bob's Lake (Timmins), in the city of Timmins, Cochrane District

See also 
 Bobs (disambiguation)
Bobs Lake in Washington State's Alpine Lakes Wilderness